Charles Hafner (October 28, 1888 – July 29, 1960) was an American sculptor. His work was part of the sculpture event in the art competition at the 1928 Summer Olympics.

References

1888 births
1960 deaths
20th-century American sculptors
20th-century American male artists
American male sculptors
Olympic competitors in art competitions
People from Omaha, Nebraska